Fontbonne Academy is a private Roman Catholic  college preparatory high school for girls, located in Milton, Massachusetts, United States.  It is located in the Roman Catholic Archdiocese of Boston.  It was started in 1954 by the Sisters of St. Joseph. The school was fully accredited in 1959 by the New England Association of Secondary Schools and Colleges. Accreditation has been consistently renewed for ten-year periods. In January 2019, Fontbonne Academy changed its name to Fontbonne Early College of Boston.

Enrollment
Enrollment has multiplied from 97 students in 1954 to just under 400 in 2011. The student body is drawn from more than 45 cities and towns throughout the Boston area, MetroWest, and the South Shore. The school has a seven-acre campus with the original building that has been updated over the years to include science, technology and language labs. The building had a facelift in 2010 and installed many energy-saving improvements throughout. Fontbonne Academy boasts a 100% college acceptance rate. The Class of 2013 averaged $175,000 per student in grants and scholarships to four-year colleges.

History
Founded in 1954, the academy takes its name from Mother St. John Fontbonne, who re-established the congregation in France after its suppression during the French Revolution. Under her leadership, the first Sisters came to the United States. In Boston, the congregation taught in archdiocesan parochial schools, and also founded and conducted its own ministries, of which Fontbonne is one. As a sponsored ministry, Fontbonne Academy furthers the Sisters' charism — a direct outgrowth of the order's experience in revolutionary France — of reconciliation, unity and non-violence in the school's academic programs, spirituality, and co-curricular activities.

Employment discrimination controversy 

In July 2013, Fontbonne Academy rescinded a job offer made to Matthew Barrett, who had been offered a position as food services director, after Barrett listed his husband as his emergency contact on his hiring paperwork. Barrett, represented by attorneys from GLAD, filed a complaint with the Massachusetts Commission Against Discrimination in January 2014. The case moved to Massachusetts Superior Court, and on December 16, 2015, Judge Douglas H. Wilkins ruled in Barrett v. Fontbonne Academy that the Academy had violated the state's anti-discrimination laws. The parties agreed to a confidential settlement in May 2016.

Alma mater
The school song was written by Therese Higgins, CSJ (lyrics) and Berj Zamkochian (music).

Notable alumnae
Gina McCarthy - Administrator of Environmental Protection Agency (Class of 1972)
Elizabeth Hayes Patterson – Professor Emerita and Associate Dean of Georgetown University Law Center (Class of 1963)

Memberships

Massachusetts Interscholastic Athletic Association
New England Association of Schools and Colleges
 Association of Independent Schools of New England (AISNE)

References

External links
 School website
 Massachusetts Department of Education profile of school 
 Sisters of Saint Joseph of Boston website
 Sisters of Saint Joseph website

Girls' schools in Massachusetts
Catholic secondary schools in Massachusetts
Sisters of Saint Joseph schools
Educational institutions established in 1954
Educational institutions established in 1959
Schools in Norfolk County, Massachusetts
1954 establishments in Massachusetts